Forgotten Weapons is a website and channel appearing on YouTube, Utreon and Full30, created and presented by Ian McCollum, that covers the history of antique, obscure, and historically important firearms.

Videos 
Forgotten Weapons frequently features unusual, rare, odd, experimental, or one-off firearms, such as the paratroop versions of the Empire of Japan's Arisaka Type 99 rifle featuring a folding stock attached to a cabinet hinge. McCollum covers the history of such firearms in detail, and often explains how important certain firearms were to the development of weapon technologies and the history of warfare. He also usually explains the functioning and parts of the gun by dissassembling it.

McCollum often borrows the firearms from auction houses, most commonly the Rock Island Auction and Morphy Auctions. He has also written books and articles for Popular Mechanics on the topic of firearms.

Platforms
McCollum avoids political topics in favor of exclusively covering technical topics and history. He has amassed over 2 million subscribers on YouTube.  Despite this, McCollum encountered some difficulties with YouTube deleting his videos, which is why he began uploading his videos to Full30 and Floatplane.

In 2014, McCollum improved the quality of his videos by means of an IndieGogo campaign, the proceeds of which were used to purchase high-quality camera equipment.

In 2018, McCollum co-founded Headstamp Publishing with colleagues N.R. Jenzen-Jones (of Armament Research Services) and James Rupley, through which he wrote and published his book Chassepot to FAMAS. The book was crowdfunded on Kickstarter, and raised $800,256. Headstamp's second book, Thorneycroft to SA80: British Bullpup Firearms, 1901–2020, authored by Jonathan Ferguson, raised $579,585 on Kickstarter. McCollum's second book, Pistols of the Warlords, raised $1,541,381 on Kickstarter.

See also
List of YouTube personalities

References

External links
 
 

YouTube channels
2011 web series debuts
Gun writers